Paasam is a 1962 Indian Tamil-language film directed by T. R. Ramanna. It stars M. G. Ramachandran, M. R. Radha and B. Saroja Devi. The film was released on 31 August 1962 and failed commercially.

Plot 

Depicts the extraordinary love of a son towards his mother. Gopi is brought up in a juvenile home, as he accidentally commits a murder. After his release he searches for his mother and brother, but is unable to trace them. He lands up in the same village, where his brother Raghu, lives and works as a government officer. He falls in love his friend Kali's sister, Chandra, but Kali refuses the alliance, accusing him of being an orphan. Raghu and Chandra are to be engaged. Angry at being thwarted and little knowing that Raghu is his brother, he joins Swaminathan in trying to trap Raghu in a burglary case. Ironically, both Raghu and Gopi do not know the true identity of Swaminathan. It is he who had thrown away his wife Shanta, their mother, several years ago. Several truths are revealed when Gopi meets his mother face to face. Is he able to set things right?

Cast 
 M. G. Ramachandran as Gopi
 M. R. Radha as Swaminathan
 B. Saroja Devi as Manju
 T. R. Rajakumari as Shantha
 Sheeladevi as Chandra
 Kalyan Kumar as Raghu
 Ashokan as Kali
 T. R. Ramachandran as Swaminathan's servant
 S. N. Lakshmi as Meenakshi
 C. K. Saraswathi as Swaminathan's sister
 Lakshmi Rajyam as Bakkiyam
 'Kottapuli' Jayaraman as Iyer
 Kannaiah as Swaminathan's sidekick
 Soundar as Mayandi

Soundtrack 
The music was composed by Viswanathan–Ramamoorthy and lyrics were written by Kannadasan.

Release and reception 

Paasam was released on 31 August 1962 and distributed by Emgeeyaar Pictures in Madras, delayed from a 24 August release. The film failed commercially because fans of Ramachandran could not digest seeing his character dying and considered it anticlimactic. Ramanna received hundreds of letters from fans condemning him. He said the film's ending not only made him understand the actor's dominance, "but also that one could not say things that are in contradiction with people's sentiments".

References

Bibliography

External links 

1960s Tamil-language films
1962 films
Films directed by T. R. Ramanna
Films scored by Viswanathan–Ramamoorthy